The Körös culture/Criș culture is a Neolithic archaeological culture in Central Europe that was named after the river Körös in eastern Hungary. The same river has the name Criș in Romania, hence the name Criş culture. The 2 variants of the river name are used for the same archaeological culture in the 2 regions. The Criș culture survived from about 5800 to 5300 BC. It is related to the neighboring Starčevo culture and is included within a larger grouping known as the Starčevo–Körös–Criş culture.

Genetics

In a 2017 genetic study published in Nature, the remains of six individuals ascribed to the Körös culture was analyzed. Of the two samples of Y-DNA extracted, one belonged to I2a2, and one belonged to G. Of the six samples of mtDNA extracted, five were subclades of K1, and one was a sample of H.

See also 
 Starčevo–Kőrös–Criș culture
 Starčevo culture

References

Sources

External links

 The Körös culture

Archaeological cultures of Central Europe
Archaeological cultures of Southeastern Europe
Neolithic cultures of Europe
Archaeological cultures in Hungary
Archaeological cultures in Romania
7th millennium BC
6th millennium BC
Starčevo–Körös–Criș culture